Božić is a common surname in Bosnia and Herzegovina, Croatia, Montenegro, and Serbia. The spelling Božič is found in Slovenia. It is derived from the name Božo.

Božić is a common surname in Croatia, with 8,115 bearers (2011 census). It is the third most common surname in Vukovar-Srijem County, and among the most common in three other counties.

In Slovenia, there are more than 3,500 people with the surname Božič, and more than 500 with the surname Božić (most of them are of Croatian or Serbian origin, since the letter "ć" doesn't exist in the Slovenian alphabet). It is the 13th most common surname in Slovenia. However, there are important regional differences: while it is the 2nd most common surname in the Lower Sava Statistical Region, and the 4th most common surname in the Coastal–Karst Statistical Region, it is extremely rare in eastern Slovenia. Around 54% of Slovenians with this surname live in Carniola, around 28% in the Slovenian Littoral, and around 13% in Slovenian Styria.

People

General 
Andrea Bosic (born Ignazio Andrej Božič, 1919–2012), Italian actor of Slovene descent
B. Wongar (born 1932 as Sreten Božić), Serbian-Australian writer
Čedomir Božić (born 1984), Serbian politician
Darijan Božič (1933–2018), Slovenian composer and conductor
Dobrivoje Božić (1885–1967), Serbian inventor
Elena Božić Talijan (born 1970), Serbian journalist and politician
Ivan Božić (1915–1977), Yugoslav historian
Marinko Božić, founder of Slobodni tjednik
Marjanca Jemec Božič (born 1928), Slovene illustrator
Milan Božić (born 1952), Serbian politician
Nenad Božić (born 1971), Serbian politician
Peter Božič (1932–2009), Slovenian writer, playwright, journalist and politician
Radič Božić (fl. 1502, died 1528), Serbian noble and titular despot of Serbia
Sandra Božić (born 1979), Serbian politician
Željko Božić (1974–2006), Serbian stuntman and actor

Fictional 
Richard Bozic, a fictional character on the Australian TV series Home and Away

Sports
Ana Božić (born 1988), Croatian basketball player
Borut Božič (born 1980), Slovenian professional road racing cyclist
Brina Božič (born 1992), Slovenian recurve archer
Dennis Bozic (born 1990), Swedish ice hockey player of Croatian descent
Dragan Božić (born 1969), Serbian politician
Iztok Božič (born 1971), Slovenian tennis player
Josip Božić Pavletić (born 1994), Croatian handball player
Luka Božič (born 1991), Slovenian slalom canoeist
Luka Božić (born 1996), Croatian basketball player
Mojca Božič (born 1992), Slovenian volleyball player
Petar Božić (born 1978), Serbian basketball coach and former player
Robert Bozic (born 1950), Canadian boxer, son of Dobrivoje Božić
Srdjan Božić (born 1984), Serbian basketball player
Stipe Božić (born 1951), Croatian mountain climber
Stjepan Božić (born 1974), Croatian boxer

Footballers 
Blaž Božič (born 1990), Slovene footballer
Filip Božić (born 1999), Bosnian-Herzegovinian footballer
Helena Božić (born 1997), Montenegrin footballer
Igor Božić (born 1987), Serbian footballer
Ivan Božić (born 1983), Bosnian-Croat footballer
Ivan Božić (born 1997), Croatian footballer
Mario Božić (born 1983), Bosnia and Herzegovina international footballer
Marko Božič (Slovenian footballer) (born 1984), Slovenian international footballer
Marko Božić (born 1998), Austrian footballer
Milan Božić (born 1982), Canadian soccer player of Serbian descent
Mile Božić (born 1981), Croatian footballer
Radivoj Božić (1912–1948), Serbian and Yugoslav footballer
Tomislav Božić (born 1987), Croatian footballer

See also
Božičić
Božović

References

Serbian surnames
Montenegrin surnames
Bosnian surnames
Croatian surnames
Theophoric names